Powell Butte is an extinct cinder cone butte in Portland, Oregon, United States. It is part of the Boring Lava Field, which includes more than 80 small volcanic edifices and lava flows in the Portland–Vancouver metropolitan area. The region around Powell Butte has a cool climate, and the butte and its surroundings feature meadows, rivers, and mixed forests.

Powell Butte lies within historic territory of the Confederated Tribes of the Grand Ronde Community of Oregon. The land surrounding the butte has been used for an orchard, farming, and scientific research on potatoes. Today two underground reservoirs at the Butte each hold  of fresh water as a primary part of the public water system for Portland and much of the surrounding region.

Geography and geology 

Powell Butte is located in Multnomah County in the U.S. state of Oregon.

Powell Butte is a cinder cone butte and is part of the Plio-Pleistocene Boring Lava Field, a group of volcanic cones that got their name from the low, forested Boring Hills formation. The field includes more than 80 small volcanic edifices and lava flows in the Portland–Vancouver metropolitan area, with the possibility of more volcanic deposits buried under sedimentary rock layers. Volcanism in the Boring Lava Field is the product of subduction of the Juan de Fuca oceanic tectonic plate under the North American continental tectonic plate, as well as regional rifting. Powell Butte lies northwest of the Boring Hills, and the surrounding area includes (moving clockwise from the north) other volcanic centers like Green Mountain, Prune Hill, Chamberlain Hill, Devils Rest, Larch Mountain, Pepper Mountain, Kelly Butte, and Mount Tabor.
 
The top of Powell Butte consists of volcanic rock from the Troutdale Formation, on top of which are remnants from a local eruption in the Boring Lava Field, including scoria and volcanic ash. Powell Butte is one of the smaller volcanic cones in the Boring Lava Field. During the Pliocene (5 million to 2 million years ago), hyaloclastite formed from interaction of Cascade, alumina-rich basalt lava with the Columbia River. Powell Butte is partially mantled by post hyaloclastite gravel from the Troutdale Formation, which is likely the result of redeposited soil after erosion. Like the rest of the Boring Lava Field, Powell Butte is extinct.

Climate and ecology 

The climate at Powell Butte is cool, creating a short growing season environment. It supports grass meadows, which sustain apple, pear, and walnut trees.

Powell Butte sits near Johnson Creek, a tributary of the Willamette River that sustains native salmon and rainbow trout. It also supports the Powell Butte Nature Park and its associated meadow and forest areas. These habitats are populated by bats, black-tailed mule deer, chipmunks, coyotes, gray foxes, ground squirrels, rabbits, raccoons, ring-necked pheasants, and skunks. Birds of prey are common among the park's open meadows, groves of wild hawthorn and western red cedar trees, and wetlands. Kestrels and red-tailed hawks hunt on top of the butte. There are mixed forests of bigleaf maple and Douglas fir trees on the butte's northern side.

Human history 

At the end of the 19th century, much of the meadow area near Powell Butte was cleared and replaced with an orchard by settlers. In 1925,  the Portland city government bought the land encompassing Powell Butte from George Wilson with the intent to use it for water reservoirs. They leased the northeastern part of the land to farmer Henry Anderegg, who owned and operated the Meadowland Crest Dairy until 1948. In the mid-1970s, Portland's Water Bureau created a development plan for Powell Butte including four  underground reservoirs to be built at the northern side of the mountain. The first of these reservoirs was constructed in 1981 and the second in 2014.

Recreation 

The nature park was established by Portland city government in 1987 and opened to the public in 1990 and is maintained by Portland Parks & Recreation; it currently includes a natural area, trails for biking, horseback riding, and hiking. The Friends of Powell Butte is an organization formed in 1990, which is focused on protecting the resources of the nature park. It meets monthly to implement park planning and improvement and gather citizen input.

Within the Boring Lava Field, Mount Tabor and Powell Butte are better known for their recreational uses than other cones. Powell Butte Nature Park offers  of trails, with many formal and informal paths. The top of the butte also offers views of Mount Adams, Mount Hood, Mount Jefferson, and Mount St. Helens.

References

Sources 

 

 

 .

 

 .

External links 

 Aerial photo of Powell Butte from USGS

Buttes of Oregon
Cascade Volcanoes
Cinder cones of the United States
Extinct volcanoes
Landforms of Multnomah County, Oregon
Parks in Portland, Oregon
Southeast Portland, Oregon
Subduction volcanoes
Volcanoes of Multnomah County, Oregon
Volcanoes of Oregon